LENOX Tools is an American brand of hand tools, power tool accessories, and industrial band saw blades. It largely produces saws, saw blades, utility knives, snips, and other cutting tools.

The brand was founded in 1915 as the "American Saw and Manufacturing Company" by ten employees to produce hacksaw blades. In 2003, American Saw was acquired by Newell Rubbermaid. In 2017, Stanley Black & Decker purchased the tools business of Newell Brands, including Lenox.

Gallery

See also 

Lenox Industrial Tools 301—A NASCAR race formerly sponsored by the company.

References

External links 
Lenox Industrial Tools web site

Tool manufacturing companies of the United States
Manufacturing companies based in Massachusetts
Manufacturing companies established in 1915
1915 establishments in Massachusetts
Newell Brands
Stanley Black & Decker brands